Andrei Nefedov is a paralympic swimmer from Russia competing mainly in category B3 events.

Andrei was part of the Russian Paralympic swimming team that travelled to Atlanta for the 1996 Summer Paralympics there he finished fifth in the 100m breaststroke and won bronze in the 200m breaststroke.

References

External links
 

Paralympic swimmers of Russia
Swimmers at the 1996 Summer Paralympics
Paralympic bronze medalists for Russia
Russian male breaststroke swimmers
Living people
Medalists at the 1996 Summer Paralympics
Year of birth missing (living people)
Paralympic medalists in swimming
20th-century Russian people
21st-century Russian people